Route 60A, or Highway 60A, may refer to:

India
National Highway 60A (India)

United States
 Florida State Road 60A (former)
Maryland Route 60A

See also
A60 (disambiguation)
List of highways numbered 60